Nahcolite is a soft, colourless or white carbonate mineral with the composition of sodium bicarbonate (NaHCO3) also called thermokalite.  It crystallizes in the monoclinic system. 

Nahcolite was first described in 1928 for an occurrence in a lava tunnel at Mount Vesuvius, Italy. Its name refers to the elements which compose it: Na, H, C, and O. It occurs as a hot spring and saline lake precipitate or efflorescence; in differentiated alkalic massifs; in fluid inclusions as a daughter mineral phase and in evaporite deposits.Nahcolite data on Webmineral 

It occurs in association with trona, thermonatrite, thenardite, halite, gaylussite, burkeite, northupite and borax. It has been reported in a Roman conduit at Stufe de Nerone, Campi Flegrei, near Naples; in the U. S. from Searles Lake, San Bernardino County, California; in the Green River Formation, Colorado and Utah; in the Tincalayu deposit, Salar del Hombre Muerto,
Salta Province, Argentina; on Mt. Alluaiv, Lovozero Massif and Khibiny Massif, Kola Peninsula, Russia; and around Mount Erebus, Victoria Land, Antarctica.

References

Carbonate minerals
Sodium minerals
Monoclinic minerals
Minerals in space group 14
Industrial minerals